Kristian Rees (born 6 January 1980 in Adelaide, South Australia, Australia) is an Australian football (soccer) player who plays  as a central defender.

Club career
He made his NSL debut playing for Adelaide City. He was also a member of Adelaide United's minor-premiership winning squad of 2005/06 and of the team that came runners-up in 2006/07.

He played for Adelaide United in the Hyundai A-League for the first 2 seasons of the competition, including during their inaugural foray into the Asian Champions League.

He was released by the club to the surprise of many at the end of the 2006/07 season, and joined Whittlesea Zebras in the Victorian Premier League. He made his debut for the Zebras against Green Gully on 3 June 2007 and has been one of the stand-out players in the league, leading the previously struggling Zebras to a spot in the Grand Final. Such was his impact that despite joining the Zebras after the start of the season, he still won the Club Best & Fairest Award, and though the team could not manage to beat Preston Lions in the Grand Final, Rees capped off a magnificent season by scoring his team's goal in the final, and also hit the crossbar. He was also selected for the Victorian State Team tour of China but unfortunately work commitments prevented him from taking up the spot.

On 13 November 2007 Rees signed for A-League club Wellington Phoenix until the end of the season where he joined up with former Adelaide United teammate and captain, Ross Aloisi. At the end of the 2007-2008 A-league season, Rees and Phoenix could not agree terms to extend his contract in Wellington, and after turning down the opportunity to join Chinese Super League club, Liaoning FC, he returned to Adelaide City to link up with former teammate, Damian Mori.

On 3 December 2008 he was signed to a two-year contract by Gold Coast United.

Rees ended his playing career with Palm Beach SC after a successful run in the FFA Cup playing alongside former Wellington Phoenix teammate Karl Dodd. Rees wasn't retired for 6 months before being lured out of retirement by the Sharks.

Politics
In the 2013 Australian federal election, Rees ran as the Palmer United Party candidate for the Division of Grey, and in the 2016 Australian federal election, was the lead Palmer candidate for the Senate for South Australia.

Rees also ran in the 2015 Queensland election in the seat of Currumbin.

Honours
With Adelaide United:
  A-League Premiership: 2005-2006

References

External links
 Gold Coast United profile
 Oz Football profile

1980 births
Living people
Soccer players from Adelaide
Association football central defenders
Australian soccer players
A-League Men players
FFSA Super League players
Salisbury United FC players
Para Hills Knights players
Adelaide City FC players
Modbury Jets SC players
Adelaide United FC players
Whittlesea Zebras players
Wellington Phoenix FC players
Gold Coast United FC players
Gold Coast City FC players
Expatriate association footballers in New Zealand
United Australia Party (2013) politicians
National Premier Leagues players